Itaru Nakamura (born 4 July 1963) is a Japanese police officer who served as the 29th Chief of the National Police Agency from 2021 to 2022.

Career 
On 25 August 2022, he resigned as Chief as a result of failings surrounding the Assassination of Shinzo Abe one month prior after 36 years in police service.

References 

Living people
1963 births
Commissioners of the National Police Agency (Japan)

21st-century Japanese politicians
Japanese Police Bureau government officials